Soundtrack to Your Life is the only studio album by singer Ashley Parker Angel. It is a departure from his former band O-Town, making it both Angel's and Blackground Records' only rock release. It was released on May 16, 2006, and debuted #5 on the Billboard 200 albums chart after selling more than 72,000 copies in its first week. By July 11, 2006, the album had sold nearly 150,000 copies in the US.

On August 5, 2021, Blackground Records announced on Twitter that the album will be available on streaming services on September 24, 2021, for the first time.

Track listing
"Let U Go" (Written By: A. Parker, M. Martin, L. Gottwald)
"I'm Better" (Written By: A. Parker, S. Peiken, M. Martin, L.Gottwald)
"Soundtrack to Your Life" (Written By: A.Parker, L.Christy, G.Edwards, S.Spock)
"Feel So Alive" (Written By: A.Parker, X.Barry, W.Gagel)
"Crazy Beautiful" (Written By: A.Parker, L.Christy, G.Edwards, S.Spock)
"Who Cares" (Written By: A.Parker, K.Karlin, A.Cantrall, C.Schack, R.Math)
"Shades of Blue" (Written By: A.Parker, K.Karlin, A.Cantrall, S.Hurley)
"Beautiful Lie" (Written By: A.Parker, K.Karlin, A.Cantrall)
"Perfect Now" (Written By: A.Parker, K.Karlin, A.Cantrall, Gary Clark, E.Pressly, K.Hawkes)
"Where Did You Go" (Written By: A.Parker, K.Karlin, A.Cantrall)
"Along the Way" (Written By: A.Parker, K.Karlin, A.Cantrall, L.Robbins)
"Apology" (Written By: A.Parker, X.Barry)

Target Bonus Download Track:
"Live Before I Die" (Written By: A.Parker, L.Christy, G.Edwards, S.Spock)
"Alright, OK" (Written By: A.Parker, K.Karlin, A.Cantrall, C.Schack, R.Math)

Singles

The first single from Soundtrack to Your Life was "Let U Go", released to US markets on February 26, 2006. It debuted at #17 on the Billboard Hot 100, eventually peaking at #12. It was certified Gold on June 1, 2006. The follow-up single from the album was the title track "Soundtrack to Your Life".

References 

2006 debut albums
Ashley Parker Angel albums
Universal Records albums
Albums produced by Max Martin
Albums produced by Dr. Luke